Charles-Roux may refer to:

People with the surname
Edmonde Charles-Roux (1920–2016), French writer.
François Charles-Roux (1879-1961), French businessman and diplomat.
Jules Charles-Roux (1841-1918), French businessman and politician.
Claire Charles-Roux (1908-1992), French Resistance during World War II.